Antsirabe is a town and commune in Madagascar. It belongs to the district of Ambanja, which is a part of Diana Region. According to 2001 commune census the population of Antsirabe was 3,405.

Only primary schooling is available in town. The majority 90% of the population are farmers, while an additional 1.5% receives their livelihood from raising livestock. The most important crops are rice and coffee, while other important agricultural products are seeds of catechu and pepper.  Services provide employment for 0.5% of the population. Additionally fishing employs 8% of the population.

References and notes 

Populated places in Diana Region